Ondřej Němec (born 18 April 1984) is a Czech professional ice hockey defenceman who currently plays for Severstal Cherepovets of the Kontinental Hockey League (KHL). He was selected by the Pittsburgh Penguins in the 2nd round (35th overall) of the 2002 NHL Entry Draft.

On 2 July 2014, Němec left HC Lev Praha, after it declared bankruptcy and folded, as a free agent to sign with fellow KHL club, Atlant Moscow Oblast.

Career statistics

Regular season and playoffs

International

References

External links

1984 births
Living people
Czech expatriate ice hockey players in Russia
Atlant Moscow Oblast players
HC CSKA Moscow players
HC Karlovy Vary players
HC Lev Praha players
Severstal Cherepovets players
Pittsburgh Penguins draft picks
VHK Vsetín players
Wilkes-Barre/Scranton Penguins players
Sportspeople from Třebíč
Ice hockey players at the 2018 Winter Olympics
Olympic ice hockey players of the Czech Republic
Czech ice hockey defencemen
Czech expatriate ice hockey players in the United States